Brynjar Rasmussen (born 30 June 1977 in Nordfjordeid, Sogn og Fjordane) is a Norwegian jazz musician (clarinet), brother of accordion player, award-winning photographer, social commentator, and botanist Sigve Brochmann Rasmussen (b. 1972), known from performing in bands such as Christiansand String Swing Ensemble, and for writing the commissioned work Arctic Mood for the Polar Jazz Festival in Longyearbyen (2011).

Career 
Rasmussen was known as the clarinetist in the Dixi jazz band Christiansand String Swing Ensemble. In addition to being a performing artist, he also works as composer, and is a music producer for Nordnorsk Jazzsenter. When he went to Svalbard in 2006, the fascination for the Arctic was spontaneous. He has visited Svalbard many times since then, and eventually released his debut solo album Arctic Mood (2011), composed as a commissioned work for the most northern, Polar Jazz Festival in Longyearbyen.

Discography (in selection)

Solo albums 
2011: Arctic Mood (Nordnorsk Jazzsenter, Finito Bacalao Records), a commissioned work for the PolarJazz Festival in Longyearbyen

Collaborations 
Within Christianssand String Swing Ensemble
2001: I Paris (CSSE Records)
2005: Sirkushesten Igor (Vogna Music)
2011: Christianssand String Swing Ensemble(CSSE Records)

With Elin Kåven
2009: Jikŋon musihkka/Frozen music (Nordic Notes)

References

External links 
Brynjar Rasmussen on Groove.no

Norwegian jazz clarinetists
Norwegian jazz composers
Norwegian Academy of Music alumni
1977 births
Living people
Musicians from Nordfjordeid
21st-century clarinetists